Dichomeris acmodeta is a moth of the family Gelechiidae. It was described by Edward Meyrick in 1931. It is known from Myanmar.

References

acmodeta
Moths described in 1931
Taxa named by Edward Meyrick